Doe v. University of Michigan, 721 F. Supp. 852 (E.D. Mich. 1989), was a case that determined that the University of Michigan's 1988 hate speech law violated the constitutional right to free speech.

Background
In the late 1980s, incidents of hate crimes and racial slurs were increasing on American campuses. Michigan was one of the first schools in the late 80s to adopt a hate speech code, prohibiting negative speech towards specific ethnic groups, women, LGBT people and other minorities.

Outcome
The court ruled in the favor of Doe and against UoM.

References

External links

 

1989 in United States case law
United States District Court for the Eastern District of Michigan cases
United States Free Speech Clause case law
Hate speech case law
University of Michigan
Legal history of Michigan